Series 18 of Top Gear, a British motoring magazine and factual television programme, was broadcast in the United Kingdom on BBC Two during 2012, consisting of seven episodes that were aired between 29 January and 11 March; a feature-length special focused on the presenters doing a road trip across India, titled Top Gear: India Special, preceded the series' first episode, and was aired on 28 December 2011. This series' highlights included the presenters being involved in the filming of a car chase sequence, reviewing the Chinese car industry, making home-made mobility scooters, and examining the cars made by manufacturer Saab.

A special edition episode celebrating the Bond film series' 50th Anniversary, titled "50 Years of Bond Cars", was aired on 29 October 2012 and presented by Richard Hammond. In addition, BBC Children in Need 2012 featured a special "Star in a Reasonably Priced Car" segment as part of the charity's evening entertainment on 16 November 2012.

Episodes

Special Episode

Spin-Off Special

Notes
The viewing figures shown in the Episode Table above, are a combination of the figures from the BBC Two broadcast and the BBC HD broadcast.

References

External links
Top Gear (series 18) at Top Gear Official Site

2011 British television seasons
2012 British television seasons
Top Gear seasons